Released in 1976, David was the first album for the contemporary Christian music star, David Meece.

Track listing 

All songs written by David Meece.

Side 1
"I'll Sing This Song For You" - 3:38
"Come Home, America" - 2:46
"Jesus" - 3:16
"I Love The Way He Smiles At Me" - 4:11
"I Love You, Lord" - 3:26

Side 2
"Touch My Hand" - 3:30
"Take Me Together" - 4:53
"Got To Know You're There" - 3:41
"Imagine What It'd Be Like" - 3:28
"I'll Sing This Song For You" (Reprise) (Instrumental) - 2:36

Personnel
 David Meece – vocals, piano
 Mack Dougherty – acoustic guitar, electric guitar
 Bob Thomas – acoustic guitar
 Lou Fischer – bass
 Paul Leim – drums
 Bob Piper – arrangements and conductor

Production
 Producer – Paul Baker
 Engineer – Dan Peterson
 Photography – George J. Sevra, Jr.

External links
DavidMeece.com - The official David Meece website.

David Meece albums
1976 albums